Blanchet is a French surname. Notable people with the surname include:

Abbé François Blanchet (1707–1784), French littérateur
Augustin-Magloire Blanchet (1797–1887), first Bishop of Walla Walla and Nesqually (Washington); brother of François Norbert
Emile-Robert Blanchet (1877–1943), Swiss-born, French-settled pianist and composer
François Blanchet (disambiguation)
Jean Blanchet (watchmaker), Swiss watchmaker, founder of Manufacture d'Horologerie Blanchet & Cie
Joseph-Goderic Blanchet (1820–1890), Canadian physician and politician
Luz Blanchet (born 1966), Mexican TV host
Madeleine Blanchet (born 1934), Canadian physician
Yves-François Blanchet (born 1965), Canadian politician
Karl Blanchet (born 1969), Professor in Public Health

Other uses
Blanchet (watch), luxury Swiss watch brand, belong to D Group
Blanchet (harpsichord makers), a family of harpsichord and piano makers
Mount Blanchet Provincial Park in northwestern British Columbia is named for George Blanchet

French-language surnames